Wild Horses is a 1995 Argentine road movie directed by Marcelo Piñeyro and written by Piñeyro and Aída Bortnik. It stars Héctor Alterio, Leonardo Sbaraglia, Cecilia Dopazo and Federico Luppi in a cameo appearance. The film chronicles the five days of two fugitives on the run after robbing a corporation and being targeted by the media. The film was the most popular Argentinian film of the year. It was selected as the Argentine entry for the Best Foreign Language Film at the 68th Academy Awards, but was not accepted as a nominee.

Plot 
José is an aging anarchist who decides to get even with the corporation that stole $15,344 from his family 18 years ago. When confronted by the yuppie manager, Pedro Mendoza, José threatens to kill himself and orders him to hand in the requested amount of money. In the ensuing chaos, Pedro stumbles upon a drawer holding half a million dollars, and puts it all in the bag. He then asks José to take him hostage so that the police will not shoot them, and both drive away successfully.

After the robbery, Pedro is confronted with a dilemma: he cannot turn himself in, because the stolen money is laundered money and he will thus have trouble with the mafia, so he decides to join José on a road trip to Patagonia as they run away from police and mafia alike.

On their way to the border they bond and decide to correct those false claims made by the media so as to clear their names and justify their actions. They tape a message and send it to the TV, and on the way to safety they are aided by gas station attendants who view the couple as modern-day Robin Hoods. They are nicknamed by the press coverage "Los Indomables" (The Untameable).

They decide to take a bus that will get them closer to the border with Chile (because their car ended up in a river). Aboard they meet a punk girl, Ana, who steals the bag containing the half million dollars, but promptly returns it when they catch up with her. They decide to let her into their society, and she steals a jeep for them. The three decide to "return" the money to the people, and rain the half-million on a cheering crowd, keeping only what is necessary for the trip. After that they are on the run again.

"Los Indomables" manage to get to the border after dodging a pursuing helicopter; with the aid of the gas station attendants they avoid road blocks and the two hitmen sent by the mafia, whom they finally encounter and get rid of. Once at the border, they meet with Eusebio, husband to the sister of José's long dead wife. After reconciling with him, he reveals his profession - kept secret throughout the film - to Pedro: horse breeder.

In the final moments of the movie, José bids farewell to Pedro and Ana, who have fallen in love, as they ride away on two horses to the border. José then frees all of his horses, and as he sets the last one going, he is shot in the back by a person offscreen. He dies, and the end is a montage of José's horses running free, and José himself dancing (from a previous scene in the movie) and shouting to the skies how good it feels to feel alive.

Cast
 Héctor Alterio as José
 Leonardo Sbaraglia as Pedro
 Cecilia Dopazo as Ana
 Fernán Mirás as Martín Juárez
 Daniel Kuzniecka as Rodolfo
 Antonio Grimau as Enrique García del Campo
 Cipe Lincovsky as Natalia
 Federico Luppi as Eusebio
 Eduardo Carmona
 Adrián Yospe as Thug 1
 Mónica Scaparone as Mónica
 Regina Lamm as Margarita Lamadrid
 Héctor Malamud as Mozo
 Alex Benn as Esteban
 Jorge García Marino as Pedro’s father
 Miguel Ruiz Díaz as Thug 2
 Fernando Álvarez as Truck driver 1
 Tito Haas as Truck driver 2
 Ernesto Claudio as Editor
 Emilio Bardi as Carrasco
 Jorge Petraglia as Rogelio
 Pablo Patlis as Assistant to García del Campo
 Eduardo Peaguda as Saverio
 Óscar Rodríguez as Truck driver
 Alejandro Fiore as Truck driver
 Alejandro Fain as Truck driver
 Jorge Prado as Truck driver
 Miguel Ángel Porro as Petrol station owner
 Hernán Alix as Policeman 1
 Juan Carlos Silvetti as Policeman 2
 Julia Calvo as Nurse
 Analía Vigliocco as Nurse
 Celina Tell
 Laura Carina Pantaleone as Journalist''
 Héctor Bordoni
 Marina Peralta Ramos
 Federico D'Elía
 Luz Moyano
 Guadalupe Martínez
 Guillermo Hernández
 Silvia Dotta
 Marcelo Carmelo
 José Zelik
 Augusto Rommer
 Roberto Dimare

See also
 List of submissions to the 68th Academy Awards for Best Foreign Language Film
 List of Argentine submissions for the Academy Award for Best Foreign Language Film

References

External links
 
 

1995 films
Argentine drama films
1990s Spanish-language films
1990s road movies